James Brown (November 1682 – 1769) was a member of the Connecticut House of Representatives from Norwalk, Connecticut Colony in the sessions of October 1720, May 1756 and May 1757.

He was the son of James Browne and Rebecca Ruscoe.

In 1708, he was one of the purchasers of Ridgefield, Connecticut. He was also a purchaser of a large tract of land in Salem on which his son James Brown, Jr settled.

He was a partner of William Smith, Chief Justice of the Province of New York.

References 

1682 births
1769 deaths
Connecticut lawyers
Members of the Connecticut House of Representatives
Politicians from Norwalk, Connecticut
People of colonial Connecticut